Great Bradley is a village and civil parish in the West Suffolk district of Suffolk in eastern England. According to Eilert Ekwall the meaning of the village name is the "wide clearing". The population is about 400 and includes Little Bradley. There is evidence that people have lived in and around Great Bradley by the River Stour since the middle stone age over 5,000 years ago.

John Killingworth (d.1617) of Little Bradley (later of Pampisford, etc.) obtained a grant (or confirmation) of Arms on 25 November 1586. When his father Richard died in October 1586 he requested in his Will that "My body is to be buried in the parish church of Great Bradley. 10 shillings to the said church."

References

External links 

 Great Bradley Village Website 
 Great Bradley Village Facebook Group 

Villages in Suffolk
Civil parishes in Suffolk
Borough of St Edmundsbury